Naga, officially the City of Naga (Central Bikol: Siyudad nin Naga; Rinconada Bikol: Syudad ka Naga) or the  Pilgrim City of Naga, is a 1st class independent component city in the Bicol Region of the Philippines. According to the 2020 census, it has a population of 209,170 people. It is one of the two Philippine cities named Naga, the other being in Cebu in Visayas.

The town was established in 1575 by order of Spanish Governor-General Francisco de Sande. The city, then named Ciudad de Nueva Cáceres (New Cáceres City), was one of the Spanish royal cities in the Spanish East Indies, along with Manila, Cebu, and Iloilo, the third oldest to be exact.

Geographically and statistically classified, as well as legislatively represented within Camarines Sur, but administratively independent of the provincial government, Naga is considered by some sources to be the Bicol Region's trade, business, religious, cultural, industrial, commercial, medical, educational, and financial center.

Naga is known as the "Queen City of Bicol" due to the historical significance of Naga in the Bicol Region; as the "Heart of Bicol", due to its central location on the Bicol Peninsula; and as the "Pilgrim City," as Naga is also the destination of one of the largest Marian pilgrimages in Asia to the shrine of Our Lady of Peñafrancia, an image that is one of the country's most popular objects of devotion. Naga is also known as "One of the Seven Golden Cities of the Sun" as stated by Nick Joaquín.

Etymology

Naga is the native pre-colonial name of the city. It is named after the narra tree (Pterocarpus indicus), which is known as naga in the Bikol language. It was abundant in the region and was part of a pre-colonial industry of wooden cups and bowls made from narra that produced distinctive blue and yellow opalescent colors when water is poured into them (later known to Europeans as lignum nephriticum). During the Spanish colonial era, they were exported to Mexico as luxury goods for their purported diuretic properties via the Manila-Acapulco Galleons, and from there, to Europe. They were often presented as gifts to European nobility.

The Jesuit missionary and historian Juan José Delgado (1697-1755) describes the industry in the following:

History

Precolonial era
The Bicolandia was closely allied with the Kedatuan of Madja-as Confederation, which was located southeast on Panay Island. According to the epic Maragtas, two datus and their followers, who followed Datu Puti, arrived at Taal Lake, with one group later settling around Laguna de Bay, and another group pushing southward into the Bicol Peninsula, placing the Bicolanos between people from Luzon and people from the Visayas. An ancient tomb preserved among the Bicolanos, discovered and examined by anthropologists during the 1920s, refers to some of the same deities and personages mentioned in the Maragtas.

Spanish colonial period

In 1573, on his second expedition to this region, the conquistador Juan de Salcedo landed in a settlement named Naga in the native languages, because of the abundance of narra trees (naga in Bikol).

In 1575, Captain Pedro de Chávez, the commander of the garrison left behind by Salcedo, founded on the site of the present business centre (across the river from the original Naga) a Spanish city which he named La Ciudad de Cáceres, in honor of Francisco de Sande, the Governor-General and a native of Cáceres in Spain. It was by this name that it was identified in the papal bull of August 14, 1595, which established the see of Cáceres, together with Cebú and Nueva Segovia, and made it the seat of the new bishopric subject to the Archdiocese of Manila. Nueva Caceres was settled by around 100 Spaniards from Europe and reinforced by migrations from Mexico.

In time, the Spanish city and the native village merged into one community and became popularly known as "Nueva Cáceres", to distinguish it from its namesake in Spain. It had a city government as prescribed by Spanish law, with an ayuntamiento and cabildo of its own. At the beginning of the 17th century, there were only five other ciudades in the Philippines. Nueva Cáceres remained the capital of the Ambos Camarines provinces and later of Camarines Sur province until the formal creation of the independent chartered city of Naga under a sovereign Philippines.

For hundreds of years during the Spanish colonial era, Naga grew to become the center of trade, education, and culture, and the seat of ecclesiastical jurisdiction in Bicol.

American colonial period

With the advent of American rule, the city was reduced to a municipality. In 1919, it lost its Spanish name and became officially known as Naga.

World War II and Japanese occupation
Naga came under Japanese occupation on December 18, 1941, following the Japanese invasion of Legaspi a few days earlier.

In 1945, toward the end of World War II, combined U.S. and Philippine Commonwealth troops—of the United States Army, Philippine Commonwealth Army, Philippine Constabulary, as well as Bicolano guerrilla resistance groups—liberated Naga from Imperial Japanese troops.

Independent Philippines
After Naga was liberated from the Japanese, Naga began rebuilding. Having suffered only a few casualties, Naga was able to rebuild quickly after the war.

Cityhood

After many petitions, Naga became a city on June 18, 1948, when it acquired its present city charter; and its city government was inaugurated on December 15 of the same year by virtue of Republic Act No. 305.

Geography

It is surrounded on all sides by forests and by rich agricultural and fishing areas. It has an area of 84.48 km² and is located on the serpentine and historic Naga River, at the confluence of the Naga and Bikol rivers. Thus, it has always been an ideal place for trade, and as center for schools, church, and government offices. Included in its territory is Mount Isarog, a declared protected area known as Mount Isarog Natural Park covering 10,090.89 hectares.

Climate

According to the Köppen climate classification system, Naga has a tropical savanna climate.

The typhoon season is from June to October, and the weather then is generally rainy. The average year-round humidity is 77%.

Barangays
Naga is politically subdivided into 27 barangays.

Demographics

According to the 2020 census, the population of Naga is 209,170 people, with a density of 2,300/km2. Naga had an average annual population growth of 1.29% between 2010 and 2020 according to same census. All populated areas of the city are classified as urban. Naga City has about the same population as Legazpi City (209,533).

Religion

Roman Catholicism

The city is the ecclesiastical seat of the Archdiocese of Caceres, which oversees the Catholic population in the Bicol Region, whose archbishop is the primate of the region. This dominant faith is supported by the presence of old and influential Catholic institutions, from universities to churches run by different religious institutes, notably the Ateneo de Naga University by the Jesuits; the Universidad de Santa Isabel by the Daughters of Charity; the Naga Metropolitan Cathedral, which is the oldest cathedral that is still standing in Luzon outside Metro Manila; Peñafrancia Basilica Minore, which is the largest Catholic structure in southern Luzon in terms of size and land area; Our Lady of Peñafrancia Shrine; the historic San Francisco Church; and Peñafrancia Museum.

Other Christian faiths
Protestant denominations in the city include Seventh-day Adventists and Bible Baptists, whose churches are located along Magsaysay Avenue, while other Protestants attend the Methodist Church which is among the old structures along Peñafrancia Avenue.

The Assemblies of God maintains a fast-growing ministry in Naga. Aside from Naga Bethel Church (formerly Naga Bethel Temple), which is located on Felix Plazo Street, other local congregations are Philippians Christian Fellowship (in barangays San Felipe), Gethsemane Christian Ministries (in Carolina), and outreach ministries in other barangays.

The largest minority religion in Naga is Iglesia ni Cristo (INC). INC has several chapels in different barangays in the city, and the local congregation is the largest in the district.

There is also a concentration of Jesus Miracle Crusade ministries in the city.

Other religions

Muslims, Sikhs, and Taoists can also be found in the city.

Language
The Coastal Bikol-Central dialect of the Coastal Bikol language is the dominant dialect spoken by the population in Naga. Central Standard Bikol is also the basis for other dialects in the Bicol Region. The majority of the city's population can understand and speak English, Filipino, and Tagalog. Because of the influx of people from the Rinconada area that are studying in different universities, Rinconada Bikol can also be heard in different schools and throughout the city. Some Nagueños have varying degrees of proficiency with Rinconada Bikol, due to the fact that the southern half of Pili, which is the boundary between Rinconada Bikol and Coastal Bikol speakers, is just few kilometers away from Naga. Although the main language is Bikol, and the medium of instruction in school is English, people in Naga usually tell time and count in Spanish.

Isarog Agta Language
In 2010, UNESCO released its 3rd volume of Atlas of the World's Languages in Danger, where three critically endangered languages were in the Philippines. One of these is the Isarog Agta language, of the Isarog Agta people, who live on Mount Isarog and are one of the original Negrito settlers in the Philippines, belonging to the Aeta people classification but with language and belief systems unique to their own culture and heritage.

Only five Isarog Agta spoke their indigenous language in the year 2000. The language was classified as "Critically Endangered", meaning the youngest speakers are grandparents and older, speak the language partially and infrequently, and hardly pass the language to their children and grandchildren. If the remaining 150 Isarog Agta do not pass their native language to the next generation, it will be extinct within one to two decades.

Economy

Naga is the Bicol Region's center of commerce and  industry. Strategically located at the heart of Bicol, Naga is the trade center in Bicol for goods from Visayas and Manila. Naga is cited as one of the "Most Business-Friendly Cities in Asia", is considered to be one of the Philippines's Top-10 cities, and is the No. 1 competitive independent component city (2022) of the Philippines. Some entrepreneurs cited the city as the most business-friendly in the region.

Business districts

Downtown Naga is located in the southern part of the city. It is bordered on the north by the Naga University Belt and on the south by the historical Naga City Peoples Mall or simply Naga City Community Supermarket. It encompasses the three plazas of Naga: The Plaza Quince Martires, The Plaza Quezon, and the Plaza Rizal, which is the center of Central Business District 1 (CBD-1). Downtown Naga is the location of local businesses that sell local delicacies and native products from neighboring municipalities and provinces.

A second business district, known as the Central Business District 2 (CBD-2), is located along Panganiban Drive and Roxas, Ninoy, and Cory avenues. It is also the location of 3 shopping complexes, a bus terminal, and the Camarines Sur Industrial and Technological Park, which houses several business process outsourcing offices.

South Riverfront growth area
South Riverfront is composed of the whole of Barangay Sabang except those areas that are socialized housing sites or are otherwise excluded by the Naga City land-use plan for commercial or industrial development. It is bordered by CBD-1 (to the east), the Naga River, and the town of Camaligan, Camarines Sur.

Magsaysay district
The main road in the city is Magsaysay Avenue, or Boulevard, which runs from Bagumbayan Road (Naga-Calabanga–Siruma–Garchitorena–Partido North Road), connecting it to Magsaysay district, where accommodations and restaurants catering to travelers are found.  Businesses are open until late at night, with some shops open 24/7. Naga also has its share of fastfood restaurant chains. The city hall and several provincial offices are also located in the district, around the Peñafrancia Basilica.

Banking and finance

In 2017, the banks in the city numbered around 66, excluding Bangko Sentral ng Pilipinas. The city hosts the regional bank offices of Banco de Oro, Philippine National Bank, Development Bank of the Philippines, Metrobank, RCBC, Allied Bank, China Banking Corporation, Philtrust Bank, UnionBank of the Philippines, Philippine Veterans Bank, Asia United Bank, Maybank, Bank of Commerce, East West Bank, Bank of Makati, Bank of the Philippine Islands, and the Philippine Postal Savings Bank. Other government banks include Landbank of the Philippines and Development Bank of the Philippines.

Shopping malls and Hotels
SM City Naga is one of the largest and most-visited shopping malls in the Bicol Region. Robinsons Place Naga opened in 2017. Nagaland E-Mall is in Downtown Naga. LCC Central Mall Naga is located on Felix Plazo Street. Gaisano Mall Naga is near the Bicol Medical Center. The Vista Mall is located on Maharlika Highway, in Barangay Del Rosario. There are two Puregold supermarkets in Naga. Avenue Square is the region's first "lifestyle center", built in 2005 along Magsaysay Avenue. Ongoing construction of S&R Membership Shopping, located at Roxas Boulevard, Diversion Road, is expected to open this year in September 2023. While Landers Superstore is expected to start its construction within 2023. There are also leisure hubs in the city, the majority along Magsaysay Avenue, Dayangdang and along Diversion Road. There are around sixty (60) hotels and inns within the city proper, having two 4-star hotels which is Avenue Plaza Hotel and Summit Hotel Naga and ten (10) 3-star hotels.

IT–Business Process outsourcing
Naga was cited as one of the best places to conduct information technology–business process outsourcing (IT–BPO) activities in the Philippines.

The city currently has three IT parks—Naga City IT Park, Camarines Sur Industrial and Technological Park, and Naga City Technology Center.

IBM leased their own client innovation center in front of SM City Naga.

Culture
Naga is considered to be Bicol's cultural center, due to the largest festival in the region, the Peñafrancia Festival, being held in the city.

Festivals

The Peñafrancia Festival
The city celebrates the feast of Nuestra Señora de Peñafrancia (Our Lady of Peñafrancia), the patroness of the Bicol Region. Starting on the second Friday of September each year, the 10-day feast, the largest Marian devotion in the country. The start of the festival is signalled by a procession (or Translacion) when the centuries-old image of the Blessed Virgin Mary is transferred from its shrine at the Peñafrancia Basilica Minore de Nuestra Señora de Peñafrancia to the 400-year-old Naga Metropolitan Cathedral. Coinciding with nine days of novena prayer at the cathedral, the city celebrates with parades, pageants, street parties, singing contests, exhibits, concerts, and other activities. Finally, on the third Saturday of September, the image is returned, shoulder-borne by so-called voyadores, to the basilica via the historic Naga River. The following day marks the feast day of Our Lady of Peñafrancia, when Pontifical High Masses are celebrated in the basilica, attended by hundreds of thousands of faithful devotees.

Kamundagan Festival
Naga celebrates the Kamundagan Festival every Christmas. It begins with the lighting of the Christmas Village in the Plaza Quezon Grandstand.

Kinalas Festival
Naga celebrates the Kinalas Festival during its yearly anniversary of chartership or cityhood. It honors local delicacies, including kinalas and siling labuyo, with a food contest.

Food and delicacies
Naga is known for some native foods and delicacies.

Kinalas and lug-lug are noodle soup dishes served Bicol style, similar to mami except for a topping of what looks like a pansit palabok sauce, and the meaty dark soup made from boiling a cow's or a pig's head until the flesh falls off. Kinalas is from the old Bicol word kalas, which refers to the "fall off the bone" meat that is placed on top of the noodles. The soup is the broth of beef bone and bone marrow (sometimes skull and brain included) or what Manileños call bulalo. The soup is topped with very tender meat slices that also come from the head. It is usually served hot with an egg, and sprinkled with roasted garlic and spring onions. Kalamansi and patis may be added according to taste. Kinalas is usually paired with Baduya, or with Banana or camote cue.

Other delicacies, such as, buko juice, nata de coco, and pan de Naga are found in the city.

Sports

The Metro Naga Sports Complex, in Barangay Pacol, has Olympic-sized swimming pools, tennis courts, and a track oval.

The Jesse M. Robredo Coliseum, formerly the Naga City Coliseum which is renamed in honor of the late DILG secretary and former mayor of Naga, is the largest indoor arena in southern Luzon.

Transportation

Airport

The city is served by the Naga Airport (WNP) located in Barangay San Jose in the neighboring town of Pili.

Railways
Naga is the regional head office and the center point of the Philippine National Railway's Bicol Line.

Naga—along with those of adjacent towns and cities, from Tagkawayan, Quezon Province, to Ligao, Albay—is served daily by the Bicol Express. There is a plan for extending the line to Legazpi in the near future.

Roads and bridges
This translates to an increase of  since 1998.

The city is connected to the capital Manila by the Andaya and Maharlika highways.

In order to spur development in the city, the Toll Regulatory Board declared Toll Road 5 the extension of South Luzon Expressway. A , four-lane expressway starting from the terminal point of the under-construction SLEX Toll Road 4 at Barangay Mayao, Lucena City in Quezon, to Matnog, Sorsogon, near the Matnog Ferry Terminal. On August 25, 2020, San Miguel Corporation announced that they will fund the project, which will reduce travel time from Lucena to Matnog from 9 hours to 5.5 hours.

Public transportation
The most common vehicles used for intra-city travel are public-utility jeepneys (PUJ), trimobiles, and padyak.

Public utility jeepneys and multicabs, a total of 323 units, are a major mode of intra-city transport used by regular commuters.

Trimobiles are the most used land transport in the city. There are 1,500 units available for hire while 1,150 are for private use. There is now stiffer competition among drivers, which creates a wide range of problems, such as fare overcharging, refusal to convey passengers, an uneven distribution of trimobile service resulting in a shortage of transport service in some areas of the city, and rampant traffic violations.

Padyak can be used in subdivision and barangay transportation. They provide a moderate amount of speed for those travelling to the city center.

Inter-town trips are served by 403 filcab vans and 708 jeepneys, while inter-provincial trips are served by an average of 300 airconditioned and non-airconditioned buses and 88 Filcab vans.

Recently, about 50 taxi units became available in the city. They use the new SM Naga City mall as a waiting area for passengers.

Public services

Health care

Naga is the medical center of the Bicol Region. The largest hospitals include the government-owned Bicol Medical Center (1000-bed capacity by virtue of Republic Act No. 11478) and Camarines Sur Provincial Hospital, and the Universidad de Sta Isabel – Mother Seton Hospital, owned and operated by the Daughters of Charity. The Metropolitan Naga Medical District, in Naga, is the only medical district in Bicol.

Bicol Medical Center (BMC) is located in Concepcion Pequeña. It offers specialty training in internal medicine, pediatrics, general surgery, obstetrics and gynecology, anesthesiology, radiology, ophthalmology, otolaryngology, orthopedics, and traumatology. It is also a base hospital of the Helen Keller Foundation, where eye specialists from all over the country are trained and later assigned to different parts of the Philippines.

Universidad de Santa Isabel - Mother Seton Hospital (USI – MSH), is the largest private hospital in the region by number of admissions, medical equipment facilities, number of beds available, physical structure, and number of board-certified medical consultants. It is the only private hospital in Bicol offering specialty training programs, accredited by the Philippine Medical Association's component society, in major fields of medicine, such as internal medicine, pediatrics, and general surgery.

The Plaza Medica houses the Naga Endocrine Laboratory (also called the Endolab), a modern hormone laboratory and facility.

Bicol Access Health Centrum is another large hospital located in the city. It houses the Regional Disease Research Center, the first and only in the region.

Several secondary and tertiary hospitals can be found in the city.

Waste management and disposal

Solid waste
The main pollutants in the city come in the form of solid waste generated daily. Generally, these wastes come from various sources: residential, commercial, industrial, and institutional.

Naga generates approximately 85.8 tons of waste per year, based on the latest 2009 estimates, where agricultural waste makes up a little more than one-fourth (26%) of the total volume. Food waste makes up a slightly smaller share, at 23%. Paper-based materials compose 12%, while other categories contribute smaller percentages.

Solid wastes are disposed of and collected via the city's garbage trucks, which traverse ten routes on a daily basis. Collected wastes are then dumped at the dump site in Barangay Balatas, where they are segregated according to type of waste, and whether biodegradable or non-biodegradable.

Liquid waste
A study of wastewater treatment facilities is incorporated in the proposed septage management ordinance, where the city will be very strict in forcing compliance with proper waste treatment by housing and establishment owners.  The local water-utility agency has made the Metro Naga Water District its local partner in providing septage services, in exchange for adding environmental fees to water bills.

The new wastewater treatment facility of SM City Naga, operational since April 20, 2009, has a capacity of 500 cubic meters per day; but at present, it is treating only around 200.

Fire safety
The Naga City Fire Station is one of the most well equipped fire stations in the country. Other fire stations include Naga Chin Po Tong Fire Brigade, and the Naga White Volunteers.

Police and law enforcement
The city is the location of two of the largest police stations in the Bicol Region. The historic Naga City Police Station, which had been the military base of operations of the Guardia Civil in the region, during the time of Spanish rule. Another police office, located in Barangay Concepcion Grande, is the provincial office of the Philippine National Police for Camarines Sur.

Education
Naga is the home of the three largest universities in the Bicol Region. The city is also the home of several colleges.

Tertiary education

Ateneo de Naga University is a Jesuit university and the largest Catholic university in the Bicol Region. The school has been accredited by PAASCU since 1979 and is the first university in the Philippines to achieve PAASCU Institutional Accreditation, on top of its Autonomous and Level III status. It is a "center of excellence" in teacher education, and a center of development in business administration, entrepreneurship, and information technology. It has produced animators for the country since it launched its bachelor's degree in animation.

The Universidad de Santa Isabel was inaugurated on April 12, 1869, as a private Catholic university owned and run by the Daughters of Charity and is the "first normal school for women in the Philippines and Southeast Asia and the Heritage and Historical University of Bicol". It was established by six sisters of the order who arrived in the Bicol Region on April 4, 1868, with the Bishop of Caceres, Francisco Gainza, O.P., the founder of Colegio de Santa Isabel.

University of Nueva Caceres was the very first university in Bicol, and is considered to be largest in the region, due to its attendance and size, that offers courses from kindergarten to graduate school. Founded by Dr. Jaime Hernandez in 1948, it has grown to become one of the leading institutions of higher learning in the Philippines. All course offerings are recognized by the government, and the colleges of Arts and Sciences, Education, and Commerce are accredited by the Philippine Association of Colleges and Universities Commission on Accreditation (PACU-COA). Its College of Engineering and Architecture is now one of the few regional centers for technological education in the Philippines.

Technical colleges in the city include the South East Asian University of Technology, Naga College Foundation, AMA Computer College, and STI College. Specialized computer schools include Worldtech Resources Institute (WRI), Philippine Computer Foundation College (PCFC), and Computer Communication Development Institute (CCDI).

The country's oldest live-in Christian higher educational institute for the clergy was established in the city in the early part of the 18th century. The Holy Rosary Seminary (El Seminario del Santissimo Rosario), a Roman Catholic seminary run by the Archdiocese of Caceres, has produced 22 bishops, including the first Filipino bishop, Jorge Barlin, and the first Filipino cardinal to work in the Roman Curia, Jose Tomas Sanchez. The seminary has contributed, as well, to the national heritage, through José María Panganiban, Tomás Arejola, and seven of the Fifteen Martyrs of Bicol. On January 29, 1988, the National Historical Institute declared the Holy Rosary Seminary a National Historical Landmark.

Secondary and primary education
The government-run Camarines Sur National High School, which was established in 1902, registers over 10,000 enrollees every school year, and it is the biggest secondary school in the region. Among other secondary schools in the city is the Tinago National High School.

Naga City Science High School was established in Naga in 1994. It has pilot curricula, including the Spanish curriculum, which is the third one in the Philippines, and the journalism curriculum, which allows students to receive training and exposure to college-level situations. The school is consistently a champion at the Doon Po Sa Amin national documentary contest.

Two schools in the city, Saint Joseph School (SJS) and Naga Hope Christian School (NHCS), cater to Filipino-Chinese students.

Naga Parochial School (NPS) is the largest parochial school in the region; it receives 850 enrollees yearly. It is run by priests of the Archdiocese of Caceres. It is the first PAASCU-accredited parochial school in the Philippines. Some members of the clergy (63 as of 2007 with 3 bishops) assigned to the city are alumni of the school. Well-known personalities—such as the late Raul Roco, Jesse Robredo, Francis Garchitorena, Luis Villafuerte, Jaime Fabregas, Jonathan Dela Paz Zaens, Archbishop Adolfo Tito Yllana, and Bishop Jose Rojas—are graduates of NPS.

Private schools—such as Arborvitae Plains Montessori, Inc.; Naga City Montessori School; and the Village Montessori School—can be found in the city. Tutorial and review centers for higher education are also found in the city.

Media

Television networks

All of the major television broadcasting channels' regional offices are located in the city. ABS-CBN Corporation expanded its network in Bicol by establishing ABS-CBN Naga, which operates ABS-CBN channel 11 Naga, ABS-CBN Sports and Action Naga and MOR! Local shows such as TV Patrol Bicol, Marhay na Aga Kapamilya are broadcast throughout the region via ABS-CBN Regional, which is also stationed in the city. TV5 Network Inc.'s TV5 airs shows via channel 22, GMA Network's channel 7 and GMA News TV channel 28 are also available and the newscast Balitang Bicolandia.

Cable and satellite TV
The city's cable and satellite TV companies include South Luzon Cable and DCTV Cable Network Naga (Formerly SkyCable Naga).

Radio stations
Naga has a number of FM and AM radio stations, some of which operate 24 hours daily.

Notable personalities

Johnny Abarrientos – a Philippine basketball player who played in the PBA from 1993 to 2010. He is currently serving as coach of the team B-Meg Llamados
Kyline Alcantara – Filipina actress
Tomás Arejola –  lawyer, legislator, diplomat, political writer and a propagandist during the Spanish colonial period. 
Joker Arroyo – was a statesman and key figure in the EDSA People Power Revolution which evicted then-president Ferdinand Marcos and his family from office. He also served as Congressman of Makati for 9 years, and a member of the Senate for 12 years.  Arroyo has received various awards and commendations for his significant contributions to the law profession and public service. Among these are the Philippine Bar Association's Most Distinguished Award for Justice as a "man beholden to no one except to his country" and Senate Resolution No. 100, enacted in the 8th Congress, commending him for his invaluable services to the Filipino people. 
Wally Bayola – is a Filipino comedian, actor, and TV host of Eat Bulaga!
Ely Buendia – whose real name is Eleandre Basiño Buendia. He is a Filipino singer, frontman of Eraserheads and Pupil
Jose Fabian Cadiz – Filipino politician and vice mayor of Marikina.
Arnold Clavio – Philippine news anchor
AJ Dee – whose real name is Angel James Dee III, is an actor and an international competitive swimmer, like his younger brother Enchong Dee.
Enchong Dee – whose real name is Ernest Lorenzo Velasquez Dee, is an actor, director and model, and an international competitive swimmer. He is a contract artist of ABS-CBN and has won numerous awards for his work in movies and television. He is the younger brother of AJ Dee, also an actor and swimmer. He came to prominence after starring in his first major TV drama Katorse (2009). He played the role of "Luis" in the Filipino remake Maria La Del Barrio (2011). He also starred in Ina, Kapatid, Anak (2012–13), and Muling Buksan Ang Puso.
Amalia Fuentes – Filipina actress
Victor Dennis T. Nierva – poet, teacher, journalist, theatre actor, translator, graphic and book designer.
Salvador Panelo – former spokesman and chief legal counsel of President Rodrigo Duterte; practicing lawyer known for representing controversial figures.
Jesse Robredo – was a Filipino statesman and former mayor of Naga. Robredo was able to transform Naga from being dull and lethargic to being one of the "Most Improved Cities in Asia", as cited by Asiaweek Magazine in 1999. During his time in city hall, Robredo was credited for "dramatically improved stakeholdership and people participation in governance, in the process restoring Naga to its preeminent position as the premier city of Bicol Region." In 1995, in recognition of his skills and competence as a leader and development manager, Robredo was elected president of the League of Cities of the Philippines, the national association of city mayors. Robredo also chaired the Metro Naga Development Council. He served as chairman of the Regional Development Council, the regional planning and coordinative body of Bicol's six provinces and seven cities, from 1992 to 1998.
Leni Robredo – wife of Jesse Robredo, former congresswoman of the Third District of Camarines Sur (2013–16), and the 14th Vice President of the Philippines.
Raul Roco – was a political figure in the Philippines. He was the standard-bearer of Aksyon Demokratiko, which he founded in 1997 as a vehicle for his presidential bids in 1998 and 2004. He was a then senator and secretary of the Department of Education under the presidency of Gloria Macapagal Arroyo. He had a strong following among young voters in the Philippines, due to his efforts to promote honesty and good governance.
Tecla San Andres Ziga – female senator in the Philippines notable for being the first woman in the country to top the bar examination for law-degree graduates.
Adolfo Tito Yllana – catholic Archbishop serving as Apostolic Nuncio to Israel and Cyprus, and Apostolic Delegate to Jerusalem and Palestine

Gallery

Sister cities

Local
 Bacolod, Negros Occidental
 Cotabato City
 General Santos, South Cotabato
 Iloilo City, Iloilo
 Lucena, Quezon
 Makati
 Ozamiz, Misamis Occidental
 Parañaque
 Quezon City
 San Fernando, Pampanga
 Vigan, Ilocos Sur
 Puerto Princesa, Palawan

International
 San Leandro, California, United States

See also
 List of renamed cities and municipalities in the Philippines
 Roman Catholic Archdiocese of Caceres
 Bicolano People
 List of Bicol Region Cities and Municipalities

References

External links

 
 
 [ Philippine Standard Geographic Code]
 Philippine Census Information

 
Cities in Camarines Sur
Independent component cities in the Philippines
Populated places established in 1575
1575 establishments in the Philippines
Former provincial capitals of the Philippines
Metro Naga